Jinxiang may refer to:

Jinxiang County (金乡县), Shandong
Jinxiang, Shandong (金乡镇), town in and seat of said county
Jinxiang, Guangdong (金厢镇), town in Lufeng
Jinxiang, Zhejiang (金乡镇), town in Cangnan County
Jinxiang dialect (金乡话), dialect spoken in Jinxiang, Zhejiang